Flug- und Fahrzeugwerke Altenrhein AG (FFA) was a Swiss aircraft and railroad car manufacturing company based at Altenrhein. It was originally part of Dornier Flugzeugwerke, but was split off in 1948.

History
In the years following World War II, FFA manufactured fighter aircraft for the Swiss Air Force, based on Morane-Saulnier designs as the D-3803. These were eventually replaced in service by surplus P-51 Mustangs.

In the 1950s, FFA developed a jet fighter, the P-16. The P-16 project, while promising, was cancelled after two crashes, and Hawker Hunters were bought instead. Also the project for a Bizjet SAAC-23 was cancelled. In the 1960s the company built the Diamant series of sailplanes.

The firm licence-built many aircraft for Swiss use, including the de Havilland Vampire, de Havilland Venom, Dassault Mirage III, and F-5 Tiger II.

In 1987, the company was bought back by Dornier.

Aircraft

 FFA AS 202 Bravo
 FFA P-16
 FFA Diamant

References

External links
,

Defunct aircraft manufacturers of Switzerland
Rolling stock manufacturers of Switzerland